What Lies Within is a 2017 Nigerian drama thriller film directed by Vanessa Nzediegwu and starring an ensemble cast of Michelle Dede, Paul Utomi, Ebele Okaro, Kiki Omeili, Okey Uzoeshi, Vanessa Nzediegwu, Ken Erics, Odenike and Tope Tedela. The film was written by Paul Utomi. What Lies Within was shot on location in Lagos, Nigeria.

Premise
What Lies Within chronicles 24 hours in the life of a happily married woman and her pregnant sister-in-law who are unwittingly thrust into the center of an incident that could have far reaching consequences on their lives and those of their loved ones.

Cast
Michelle Dede as Fiona
Paul Utomi as Barry
Ebele Okaro as Mama
Kiki Omeili as Miss Dimeji
Okey Uzoeshi as Derrick
Vanessa Nzediegwu as Ireti
Ken Erics as Brian
Odenike as Esther
Tope Tedela as Gboyega
Yaw as Yaw

Production
Principal photography began in August 2015. The first poster for the film was released on May 25, 2016.
A teaser trailer for the film was released in July 2017 while an extended trailer was released in August 2017.

Awards and nominations

References

External links
 

English-language Nigerian films
Nigerian thriller drama films
Films set in Lagos
2017 thriller drama films
Films shot in Lagos
2017 drama films
2010s English-language films